John Banks is a British former professional motocross racer. He competed in the Motocross World Championships from 1963 to 1977. A four-time 500cc British national champion, Banks was twice runner-up in the 500cc motocross world championship.



Motorcycle racing career
Banks was the son of a successful builder from Bury St Edmunds. His first motorcycle was a Greeves trials motorcycle that he bought from Dave Bickers, the 1960 and 1961 European motocross champion. He then gained a sponsorship from the Dot motorcycle company and in 1963 he placed third at the Swiss Grand Prix just after turning 19. His impressive results led to an offer to ride for the BSA factory racing team in 1966 as a teammate to Jeff Smith. He contested a few rounds of the 1967 500cc motocross world championship scoring a third place at the Luxembourg Grand Prix and, placing 12th in the season final points standing. He won the 1967-1968 BBC Grandstand winter series to claim his first major victory.

Entering the 1968 season, Banks faced strong competition from the defending world champion Paul Friedrichs and his ČZ teammate Roger De Coster as well as the Swedish Husqvarna team riders Bengt Åberg and Åke Jonsson. He won his first individual race victory in the second moto of the Finnish Grand Prix where he relegated Friedrichs to second place. He won his first-ever overall world championship race at the ninth round of the series with a victory at the French Grand Prix and, followed one week later with a victory at the Dutch Grand Prix. 

The setting of round 10 at the Belgian Grand Prix was a rugged, narrow track in the forests surrounding the picturesque hilltop Citadel of Namur. First held in 1947, the Namur circuit was known as the Monaco of the motocross grand prix circuit in reference to the prestigious Formula One race. Banks would claim the championship points lead from Jonsson with a second place finish in Belgium as Jonsson suffered mechanical malfunctions. Banks finished third behind Vic Eastwood and Friedrichs at the penultimate round in Luxembourg. Going into the final race of the season, Banks held a slim points lead over Friedrichs and Jonsson. Friedrichs came out on top by winning the last race of the season to win the 1968 world championship by one point over Banks.

Banks began the 1969 season strongly with second place finishes at the season opening Austrian Grand Prix and in round 3 at the Dutch Grand Prix then, scored consecutive victories at the Czechoslovakian and Russian Grands Prix. After finishing second to De Coster at the Belgian Grand Prix, his luck began to change. He suffered an ignition failure in the West German Grand Prix, had a tire puncture in Luxembourg then, suffered another ignition failure in the French Grand Prix. Finally, at the Swiss Grand Prix he punctured another tire, allowing Bengt Åberg to overtake him to win the 1969 500cc motocross world championship.

Banks suffered a dislocated knee during the 1970 season that forced him to miss the world championships. He returned from his injury to place second behind BSA teammate Dave Nicoll in the 1970 Trans-AMA motocross series, established by the American Motorcyclist Association as a pilot event to help establish motocross in the United States. By the late 1960s, advances in two stroke engine technology meant that the heavier, four stroke machines such as Banks' BSA, were becoming obsolete in the motocross world championships.

In the middle of the 1971 season, BSA announced that they were ceasing operations, leaving Banks unemployed. He would complete the remainder of the season riding as a privateer on a Husqvarna motorcycle. At the end of the world championships, he returned to the United States where, he rode a ČZ motorcycle to once again finished as runner-up in the 1971 Trans-AMA series, this time to Suzuki rider Sylvain Geboers.

He then accepted an offer from designer Eric Cheney to campaign BSA B50 motorcycles in the 1973 FIM Motocross World Championship. Despite the BSA's weight handicap, Banks still managed several top five placings in the world championships against lighter, two stroke motorcycles, including an impressive performance at the 1973 500cc United States Grand Prix in Southern California where, on the hard packed desert terrain, the explosive power delivery of two stroke engines put them at a disadvantage to more tractable power delivery of Banks' BSA. He finished the first moto in third place behind Willy Bauer and Roger De Coster then, finished the second moto in fourth place behind Bauer, Gerrit Wolsink and Jaak van Velthoven.

After two seasons riding for Cheney, in 1975 Banks switched to CCM motorcycles, also powered by BSA engines. He managed some impressive results in 1977 including, a fourth place in Canada and an inspired performance at the 500cc British Grand Prix where he finished the second moto in second place behind Heikki Mikkola on a Yamaha and ahead of fellow countryman Graham Noyce on a Honda. 1977 would be his final season in the motocross world championships.

During his motorcycle racing career, Banks won four British 500cc motocross championships, four BBC Grandstand trophy titles, two World of Sport championships, was named East Anglian Sports Personality of the Year, and was twice the runner-up in the 500cc motocross world championship. His son, Mark Banks won the 1988 125cc British motocross national championship and, his grandson Elliot Banks Browne won the 2012 MX2 British national championship.

References

Living people
Sportspeople from Bury St Edmunds
British motocross riders
Motorcycle trials riders
Date of birth missing (living people)
Year of birth missing (living people)